Raja Sir Basudeb Sudhal Deb  (16 May 1850 – 19 November 1903) was the Raja of Bamra from 1869 to 1903. In 1865 he was adopted by Brajasundar Deb, his uncle, and he ascended upon his death on 12 May 1869. He was said to have been a benevolent and enlightened raja and to have improved much.

He had four wives, the first of which, Rani Giriraj Kumari of Kalahandi, he married in 1871. Between them his wives bore eight sons and eleven daughters before his death in Calcutta, on 19 November 1903. He was succeeded by Satchitananda Tribhuban Deb.

External links
Rajah Deb Sudhal

People from Odisha
1850 births
1903 deaths
Knights Commander of the Order of the Indian Empire